Jorge Aldrete Lobo (13 July 1940 – 1 July 2020) was a Mexican chess International Master (IM) and International Correspondence Chess Grandmaster (2006).

Biography 
Jorge Aldrete Lobo learned to play chess at the age of 14. In 1955 he won the Mexican Youth Chess Championship. In 1957 in Toronto Jorge Aldrete Lobo participated in 4th World Junior Chess Championship and ranked in 8th place. 

Jorge Aldrete Lobo played for Mexico in the Chess Olympiad:
 In 1964, at first board in the 16th Chess Olympiad in Tel Aviv (+6, =6, -6),
 In 1978, at fourth board in the 23rd Chess Olympiad in Buenos Aires (+5, =4, -2),
 In 1982, at first reserve board in the 25th Chess Olympiad in Lucerne (+6, =3, -3).

In later years, Jorge Aldrete Lobo active participated in correspondence chess tournaments. In 2006, he was awarded the International Correspondence Chess Grandmaster (GMC) title.

In the late 1970s, Jorge Aldrete Lobo led the Mexican Chess Federation (FENAMAC). By profession he was a chemical engineer.

References

External links

1940 births
2020 deaths
Sportspeople from Mexico City
Chess International Masters
Correspondence chess grandmasters
Mexican chess players
Chess Olympiad competitors